Kuigaliai is a village in Jonava district municipality, in Kaunas County, in central Lithuania. According to the 2011 census, the village has a population of 409 people. Village established on Barupė river.

Education 
Barupė primary school

References

Villages in Jonava District Municipality